Agnathia (also termed hypognathous) is absence of a portion or the entirety of one or both jaws. It is a very rare condition.

See also
 Micrognathia

References

Pathology of the maxilla and mandible